William Fielding (17 June 1915 – May 2006) was an English footballer who played as a goalkeeper for Cardiff City, Bolton Wanderers and Manchester United in the 1930s and 1940s.

Career
Born in Broadhurst, Congleton, Cheshire, Fielding began his football career playing for the Broadbottom YMCA's team, before joining Hurst. In May 1936, at the age of 20, Fielding joined Cardiff City, where he played until the outbreak of the Second World War in 1939, making a total of 50 appearances in that time. During the war, Fielding made guest appearances for Stockport County and Bolton Wanderers. He officially became a Bolton Wanderers player in June 1944, but never made a league appearance for them.

In January 1947, Fielding signed for Manchester United as cover for the injured Jack Crompton in a deal which saw Billy Wrigglesworth move to Bolton. He made his debut on 25 January 1947, playing in the club's FA Cup Fourth Round defeat to Nottingham Forest. He played in seven consecutive games for United, culminating with a 4–3 away defeat to Derby County on 15 March. However, he never played for the club again after that, and retired from football in 1948.

External links
Profile at StretfordEnd.co.uk
Profile at MUFCInfo.com

1915 births
2006 deaths
People from Congleton
English footballers
Association football goalkeepers
Ashton United F.C. players
Cardiff City F.C. players
Bolton Wanderers F.C. players
Manchester United F.C. players
English Football League players
Sportspeople from Cheshire